Japanese Journal may refer to

 Japanese Journal of Applied Physics
 Japanese Journal of Religious Studies
 Japanese Journal of Tropical Medicine and Hygiene

See also
 Tokyo Journal, formerly published internationally as Japan Journal